The Men's 50 metre breaststroke competition at the 2019 World Championships was held on 23 and 24 July 2019.

Records
Prior to the competition, the existing world and championship records were as follows.

Results

Heats
The heats were held on 23 July at 10:00.

Semifinals
The semifinals were held on 23 July at 20:41.

Semifinal 1

Semifinal 2

Swim-off
The swim-off was held on 23 July at 22:02.

Final
The final was held on 24 July at 21:03.

References

Men's 50 metre breaststroke